The 1882 Belmont Stakes was the 16th running of the Belmont Stakes. It was held on June 8, 1882, at Jerome Park Racetrack in Fordham, Bronx, New York City.

In a field of three horses, Forester, the favorite ridden by Jim McLaughlin, won the event by five lengths over second place Babcock. For winning, Forester's owners received $2,600.

Bred by August Belmont, Forester was the last New York-bred horse to win the Belmont Stakes before Tiz the Law won the 2020 Belmont Stakes.

Results

References

Jerome Park Racetrack
Belmont Stakes races
Belmont Stakes
Belmont Stakes
Belmont Stakes
Jerome Park, Bronx
Horse races in New York City